The Waddy House, also known as the Williamson farm or the Jarvis Ballard house, is a historic home located at Princess Anne, Somerset County, Maryland, United States. It is a -story, Georgian-style mid-18th-century brick house supported by a raised Flemish bond brick foundation. The four-room plan dwelling measures 32 feet across by 32 feet deep. The house is one of a small collection of early brick houses surviving in Somerset County.

The Waddy House was listed on the National Register of Historic Places in 1988.

References

External links
, including photo from 1994, at Maryland Historical Trust

Houses in Somerset County, Maryland
Houses on the National Register of Historic Places in Maryland
Houses completed in 1740
Georgian architecture in Maryland
National Register of Historic Places in Somerset County, Maryland